Vadim Zinovyevich Rabinovich (born 4 August 1953) is an Israeli and formerly Ukrainian oligarch and Jewish community leader. He is a former leader of the banned Opposition Platform — For Life party, as well as an unsuccessful candidate in the 2014 Ukrainian presidential election and a People's Deputy of Ukraine from the 8th and 9th Verkhovna Rada (Ukraine's parliament) convocations, serving as a member of the Opposition Bloc from 2014 to 2019 and as a member of Opposition Platform — For Life from 2019 until he was removed from office by the party for his support of Russia during the 2022 Russian invasion of Ukraine.

Born in Kharkiv, Rabinovich spent seven years in Soviet prisons for alleged embezzlement and involvement with the black market, and made aliyah to Israel in the early 1990s, becoming an Israeli citizen in 1999. Rabinovich was a supporter of efforts to restore the Hurva Synagogue, for which a square was named after him after he was mistakenly believed to be deceased. In addition to his leadership of the Jewish community in Ukraine and philanthropic activities in Israel, Rabinovich is known for his support of pro-Russian politics in Ukraine, including his founding of the Opposition Platform — For Life political party and participation in the 2014 Ukrainian presidential and parliamentary elections. 

In 2022, Rabinovich left Ukraine shortly after the beginning of the Russian invasion of Ukraine, beforehand blaming the possibility of the war on the west and Ukraine on his Facebook. In March 2022, his position as a People's Deputy of Ukraine was terminated by Opposition Platform — For Life. The next month, Ukraine's government placed Rabinovich on a list of 111 people labelled as traitors in the war with Russia, and in July 2022, his citizenship was revoked by President Volodymyr Zelenskyy, along with Ihor Kolomoyskyi and eight other Ukrainian oligarchs. On 3 November 2022 parliament officially terminated the powers of the People's Deputy Rabinovich because of his deprivement of Ukrainian citizenship.

Early life and career 
In 1970, Rabinovich graduated from Kharkiv Secondary School 45 and entered the Kharkiv National Automobile and Highway University. From 1973 to 1975, he performed mandatory military service in the Soviet Army's Air Defense Army.

On 20 January 1980, he was arrested for "embezzlement of state funds in especially large amounts", but was released after a nine-month investigation. Between 1980 and 1982, he headed wooden door production workshops.

Early in 1982, he was again arrested for "embezzlement of state fund in especially large amounts". On 10 February 1984, he was sentenced to 14 years in forced labor camp by the Kharkiv Oblast court. His assets were confiscated, and professional activity was prohibited for 5 years. Rabinovich spent a total seven years in Soviet prisons, and has referred to the charges against him by Soviet prosecutors as "trumped up".

In early 1986, following an early release, he began operating a business. Rabinovich, along with Andrii Alioshyn, established the Pinta firm, engaged in trading metals.

Activities in Israel 
In the early 1990s, Rabinovich made aliyah to Israel, and acquired citizenship in 1999. A naturalized Israeli citizen, Rabinovich maintains homes in Ukraine and Israel.

As a result of his extensive funding of the Hurva Synagogue's restoration, the square where the synagogue resides was named after him. In 2012, councilwoman Rachel Azaria petitioned the Supreme Court of Israel to rescind the naming of the square, saying that Rabinovich was mistakenly though to be deceased. The Supreme Court agreed, revoking the naming of the square; Israeli law forbids the naming of streets and public venues in Jerusalem after living people. Rabinovich has supported Jewish charitable organisations, and is a benefactor of the golden menorah in Jerusalem's Temple Institute.

Some Jewish leaders have accused Rabinovich of trying to buy positive publicity to make up for the negative publicity generated by his financial and political activities.

Activities in Ukraine 
In fall 1993, Rabinovich was appointed as Ukrainian representative of Austrian-based Nordex company. The reputation of Nordex president and Russian mafia leader Grigory Luchansky has affected the image of Rabinovich. Rabinovich had his visa to the United States revoked in 1995, reportedly due to his links to arms dealers.

In 1997, Rabinovich founded the 1+1 TV channel with Alexander Rodnyansky and Boris Fuksman. In 1996, he was appointed chairman of the Israeli-Ukrainian Chamber of Commerce. From 1997 to 2009, Rabinovich was president of the Stolichnye Novosti publishing company. The same year, Rabinovich also created the All-Ukrainian Jewish Congress. In 2008, Rabinovich acquired the NewsOne TV channel.

On 24 June 1999, the Security Service of Ukraine (SBU) banned Rabinovich from entering Ukraine for a period of 5 years. According to the SBU press service, the decision is taken as Rabinovich's activity caused considerable damage to the economy of Ukraine. Later media reports stated that the SBU decision was related to the fact that Rabinovich leaked information about the sale of ammunition by Ukraine to Yugoslavia despite the then-effective international embargo.

With help from Rabinovich, a monument to victims of terrorism was dedicated in Kyiv by Ukrainian President Viktor Yushchenko, U.S. ambassador John E. Herbst and Russian ambassador Viktor Chernomyrdin on 11 September 2005. Since 1997, he has been president of the All-Ukrainian Jewish Congress. In 2001, Rabinovich became head of the Step Towards Unity Forum of Christians and Jews. In 2011, with fellow Ukrainian oligarch Ihor Kolomoyskyi, he founded the European Jewish Union (now known as the European Jewish Parliament), and served as co-chair of the organisation.

He was president of the Arsenal Kyiv football club from 2007 until the club's collapse in 2013.

In March 2013, Rabinovich survived an apparent attempt on his life in Kyiv after an explosive device was hurled into Rabinovich's car near Klovska metro station.

2014 Ukrainian presidential and parliamentary election 
On 25 March 2014, Rabinovich registered with the Central Election Commission as a self-nominated candidate for the presidency of Ukraine. This was partly to counter the characterization of the new Ukrainian government as antisemitic. After registering, Rabinovich said: "I want to destroy the myth about an anti-semitic Ukraine which is spreading around the world. Probably I'm the most fortunate candidate. Today unification is needed, and I'm a unifying candidate. I have no maniacal thirst for power, I just want to help the country". In the election, he received 2.25% of the vote, with his best showing in Dnipropetrovsk and the Zaporizhzhia, Mykolaiv and Odesa oblasts. Rabinovich was elected to the Verkhovna Rada (Ukraine's parliament) the same year, placing fourth on the pro-Russian Opposition Bloc's electoral list.

In July 2016, Rabinovich suspended his membership with the party, and, together with ex-Opposition Bloc member Yevhen Murayev, created the Opposition Platform — For Life political party. However, Rabinovich did not leave the Opposition Bloc parliamentary faction, so as to maintain his status as a People's Deputy. On 15 November 2018, Rabinovich announced he would not take part in the 2019 Ukrainian presidential election, but that he would top the party list in the following 2019 Ukrainian parliamentary election.

In 2021, Rabinovich launched an unsuccessful attempt to impeach Ukrainian President Volodymyr Zelenskyy over the government's shuttering of three television stations deemed to be pro-Russian.

2022 denunciation and revocation of citizenship 
On 14 February 2022, Rabinovich published a post on Facebook, stating that "the war has started" and blaming the West and Ukraine for it. Following the start of the 2022 Russian invasion of Ukraine, he left Ukraine and fled abroad.

On 17 March 2022 his own party Opposition Platform — For Life, due to his support for Russia during the Russian invasion, terminated his term of office as a People's Deputy. On 6 September 2022 Rabinovich asked the Supreme Court of Ukraine to overturn this decision as an alleged violation of the established parliamentary procedure.

In April, Chesno and the National Agency for Prevention of Corruption (NAPC) placed Rabinovich on a published list of people accused of treason, calling him a "collaborator, pro-Russian politician".

In July 2022, reports emerged alleging that President Volodymyr Zelenskyy had signed a decree to revoke Rabinovich's Ukrainian citizenship. Serhiy Vlasenko (a People's Deputy of Ukraine) posted what he claimed was copy of the decree on his Facebook page.

On 3 November 2022 parliament officially terminated the powers of the People's Deputy Rabinovich because of his deprivement of Ukrainian citizenship.

Political positions
Rabinovich stands for a non-aligned status of Ukraine, administrative reform and deep decentralization with maximum powers to the regional administrations. However, according to OPORA monitoring, never votes for bills in support of decentralisation in Ukraine. Rabinovich stated that these bills do not correspond to the concept of decentralization, so he did not vote for them. Rabinovich instead proposed to hold a referendum on the issue of abolishing the office of President of Ukraine, a new Constitution, including federalization, which he does not want to be named federalization "because that word makes people nervous."

Personal life 
Vadim Rabinovich is married to Irina Rabinovich and has three children: son Oleh (born 1973), daughter Katerina (born 1994), and son Jacob (born 2008).

Media holdings 

Rabinovich founded Media International Group (MIG), which included the Stolichnye Novosti publishing company, the MIGnovosti and MIGnews newspapers in Ukraine and Israel, respectively, and the Delovaya Nedelya business weekly, in 2000. MIG later purchased Novoe Russkoe Slovo (The New Russian Word, the oldest Russian newspaper in the US), the Narodnaia Volna radio station, the CN-Stolichnye Novosti political weekly and the Stolichka daily newspaper. Rabinovich co-owned Jewish News One from 2011 until its closure in 2014.

Notes

References

Notes

External links 
 
 An interview with Vadim Rabinovich, president of the All-Ukrainian Jewish Congress, 9 July 2004.

1953 births
Living people
Candidates in the 2014 Ukrainian presidential election
Eighth convocation members of the Verkhovna Rada
Ninth convocation members of the Verkhovna Rada
FC Arsenal Kyiv
Opposition Platform — For Life politicians
Israeli billionaires
Politicians from Kharkiv
Israeli Jews
Israeli mass media owners
Israeli people of Ukrainian-Jewish descent
Jewish philanthropists
Naturalized citizens of Israel
Opposition Bloc politicians
Businesspeople from Kharkiv
Soviet Jews
Ukrainian billionaires
Ukrainian criminals
Ukrainian collaborators with Russia
Ukrainian emigrants to Israel
Ukrainian football chairmen and investors
Ukrainian Jews
Ukrainian mass media owners
Ukrainian philanthropists
Ukrainian victims of crime
People who lost Ukrainian citizenship